Georgios Zaimis (Greece, 28 June 1937 – 1 May 2020) was a Greek sailor and Olympic Champion. He participated at three Summer Olympics. Along with his fellow crew members of the Nireus Sailing Vessel, he was named one of the 1960 Greek Athletes of the Year.

Career
He competed at the 1960 Summer Olympics in Rome and won a gold medal in the Dragon class with the boat Nireus, with Crown Prince Constantine of Greece and Odysseus Eskitzoglou. 

He finished 8th at the 1964 Summer Olympics in Tokyo and 15th at the 1968 Summer Olympics.

References

External links

Greek male sailors (sport)
Olympic sailors of Greece
Olympic gold medalists for Greece
1937 births
2020 deaths
Sailors at the 1960 Summer Olympics – Dragon
Sailors at the 1964 Summer Olympics – Dragon
Sailors at the 1968 Summer Olympics – Dragon
Olympic medalists in sailing
Medalists at the 1960 Summer Olympics
Sailors (sport) from Piraeus